Ivana Nikolić (born 1989) is a politician in Serbia. She has served in the National Assembly of Serbia since 2016 as a member of Serbian Progressive Party.

Private career
Nikolić has a master of engineering degree in transport and lives in Ub.

Politician

Parliamentarian
Nikolić received the eighty-first position on the Progressive Party's Aleksandar Vučić – Serbia Is Winning list in the 2016 Serbian parliamentary election and was elected when the list won a majority with 131 out of 250 mandates. In the parliament that followed, she was a member of the environmental protection committee; a deputy member of the European integration committee and the committee on spatial planning, transport, infrastructure, and telecommunications; and a member of the parliamentary friendship groups with Austria, Azerbaijan, Belarus, Bolivia, China, France, Georgia, Germany, Kazakhstan, Morocco, Russia, Slovenia, Sweden, and Switzerland.

She was promoted to the eighth position on the Progressive Party's list in the 2020 Serbian parliamentary election, and was elected to a second term when the list won a landslide majority with 188 mandates. She is now a member of the committee on administrative, budgetary, mandate, and immunity issues; a member of the committee on spatial planning, transport, infrastructure, and telecommunications; a deputy member of the committee on human and minority rights and gender equality; a member of Serbia's delegation to the Parliamentary Assembly of the Mediterranean; the head of Serbia's parliamentary friendship group with Ghana; and a member of the parliamentary friendship groups with Angola, Argentina, Armenia, Australia, Austria, Azerbaijan, Belarus, Brazil, Bulgaria, China, Cuba, Cyprus, Egypt, Ethiopia, Finland, Fiji, France, Germany, Greece, Hungary, India, Iran, Iraq, Ireland, Israel, Italy, Japan, Kazakhstan, Malta, Mexico, Moldova, Morocco, Myanmar, the Netherlands, North Macedonia, Norway, Palestine, the Philippines, Poland, Portugal, Qatar, Russia, Spain, Sweden, Switzerland, Tunisia, Turkey, the United Arab Emirates, the United Kingdom, the United States of America, Venezuela, and Vietnam.

Municipal politics
Nikolić received the fifth position on the Progressive Party's electoral list for the Ub municipal assembly in the 2020 Serbian local elections and was elected when the list won a majority victory with twenty-six out of thirty mandates.

References

1989 births
Living people
People from Ub, Serbia
Members of the National Assembly (Serbia)
Members of the Parliamentary Assembly of the Mediterranean
Serbian Progressive Party politicians